George Dixon (1748 – 11 November 1795) was an English sea captain, explorer, and maritime fur trader. George Dixon was "born in Leath Ward, a native of Kirkoswald". The son of Thomas Dixon, he was baptised in Kirkoswald on 8 July 1748.

In the course of the voyage he learned about the commercial possibilities along the North West Coast of America.

History has not served Dixon well; for he is the least known of those who served and or were taught by Captain Cook and is only rarely mentioned in history books. When he is mentioned, he is relegated to a minor figure, overshadowed by the more dramatic figures of Cook and William Bligh, another officer on Cook's ill-fated third trip.

In 1782, George Dixon was engaged by William Bolts. The  newspaper of 29 June 1782 carried a report from Fiume that, "in the early days of this month, Mr. von Bolts, Director of the Triestine East India Company, together with the English captain, Mr. Digson, arrived in this city". George Dixon wrote in the introduction to his account of the voyage he made for the Etches Company to the North West Coast in 1785–1788:

So early as 1781, William Bolts, Esq; fitted out the Cobenzell, an armed ship of 700 tons, for the North-West Coast of America. She was to have sailed from Trieste (accompanied by a tender of forty-five tons) under Imperial colours, and was equally fitted out for trade or discovery: men of eminence in every department of science were engaged on board; all the maritime Courts of Europe were written to, in order to secure a good reception for these vessels, at their respective ports, and favourable answers were returned; yet, after all, this expedition, so exceedingly promising in every point of view, was overcome by a set of interested men, then in power in Vienna.

The Triestine Society sent the Cobenzell in September 1783 on a commercial voyage to the Malabar Coast and China by way of the Cape of Good Hope.  After leaving Trieste, she proceeded to Marseilles, where she took in the principal part of her cargo and departed that port in December.  Apparently, Bolts still wished to carry out his North West Coast venture in connection with this voyage, and asked George Dixon to participate. However, Dixon went back to England, where he attempted to interest Sir Joseph Banks and English merchants in the North West Coast fur trade. This resulted in the formation of the Etches consortium, of which Dixon became a member with appointment as captain of the Queen Charlotte. The similarity is notable between the plan of the consortium and that elaborated by Bolts, which was apparently communicated to them by Dixon.

In 1785, Dixon became a partner in Richard Cadman Etches and Company, commonly called the King George's Sound Company to develop fur trade in present-day British Columbia and Alaska. In September 1785 Dixon and fellow trader Nathaniel Portlock sailed from England. Portlock was in command of the larger vessel, the 320-ton bm King George, with a crew of 59. Dixon commanded the 200 ton (bm) Queen Charlotte, with a crew of 33. Dixon and Portlock sailed together for most of their three-year voyage.

In the summers of 1786 and 1787, Dixon explored the shores of present-day British Columbia and southeastern Alaska.  He spent the intervening winter in the Hawaiian Islands, where he became the first European to visit the island of Molokai. He anchored in Kealakekua Bay, where Cook had been killed, but did not come ashore.

His chief areas of exploration were Haida Gwaii and Queen Charlotte Sound, Yakutat Bay (Port Mulgrave), Sitka Sound (Norfolk Bay), and the Dixon Entrance. While not the first European to explore the region of Haida Gwaii, he was the first to realize they were islands and not part of the mainland. On the northwestern part of Graham Island he acquired a large number of sea otter cloaks in trade with the Haida of Kiusta, under Chief Cuneah. Because of the many cloaks, he named the bay where he anchored "Cloak Bay".

After visiting China and selling his cargo, he returned to England in 1788 and published, in 1789, A Voyage Round the World, but More Particularly to the North-West Coast of America.
The book was a collection of descriptive letters by William Beresford, his cargo officer, and valuable charts and appendices by Dixon.

There was a controversy between Dixon and John Meares, another explorer who had published a book claiming credit for discoveries Dixon thought were made by others.  This controversy resulted in three pamphlets by Dixon and Meares denouncing each other.

In 1789 Dixon met with Alexander Dalrymple, the Examiner of Sea Journals for the East India Company and an influential advocate of maritime exploration, and the Under-Secretary of the Home and Colonial Office, Evan Nepean. He urged on Nepean the need to take up Dalrymple's plan for a settlement on the North West Coast to prevent the Russians, Americans or Spanish from establishing themselves there. Dixon was afraid that if nothing was done the coast and its trade would be lost to Britain. On 20 October 1789, he wrote to Sir Joseph Banks regarding the expedition being fitted out under the command of his former  shipmate, Henry Roberts, for discovery in the South Seas. He offered suggestions on the type of vessels that would be suitable and proposed the Queen Charlotte Islands as the best place to form a settlement on the North West Coast.

There was a George Dixon who taught navigation at Gosport, England and wrote a treatise entitled The Navigator's Assistant in 1791.  This may or may not be the same George Dixon.

Dixon arrived in Bermuda with his wife, Ann, via New York in February 1794. His intention was to revert to his original training and work as a silversmith/jeweller. This is borne out by an advertisement in The Bermuda Gazette in April 1794 announcing his intentions: "George Dixon, jeweller from London". The Bermuda Gazette soon reported that Dixon's wife Ann, "lately from England", died in childbirth in May 1794: she was buried at St George, Bermuda on 20 May 1794. Dixon was left with his only child, Marianna. He himself died shortly afterwards on 11 November 1795, as confirmed by a notice in the Cumberland Pacquet in February 1796: "[died] November 11 at Bermuda, Capt Dixon, the circumnavigator, a native of Kirkoswald in this county". The orphaned Marianna Dixon married a Bermudian merchant, Charles Bryan Hayward, in 1814.

Notes

References
 Wiener Zeitung, 15 and 18 January 1783

 Fulvio Babudieri, Trieste e gli Interessi austriaci in Asia nei Secoli XVIII e XIX, Padova, CEDAM, 1966, doc.26, "Certificato azionario della Société Triestine". The Universal Daily Register, 10 October 1785
 Dixon to Banks, 27 August 1784 and Banks to Dixon, 29 August 1784, British Museum (Natural History), Dawson Turner Transcripts of Banks Correspondence, vol. IV, ff.47-49; cited in David Mackay, In the Wake of Cook: Exploration, Science & Empire, 1780 1801, Wellington (NZ), Victoria UP, 1985, pp. 60–61
 George Dixon, Letter and Memorandum from Capt. George Dixon to Sir Joseph Banks regarding the Fur Trade on the Northwest Coast, 1789, San Francisco, The White Knight Press, 1941.
 George Dixon (Johann Reinhold Forster übersetzt), Der Kapitaine Portlock’s und Dixon’s Reise um die Welt, Berlin, Voss, 1790, Vorrede des Uebersetzers, p. 11; V.T. Harlow, The Founding of the Second British Empire, Vol.2, London, Longmans, 1964, p. 420
 Instructions to Portlock and Dixon, September 1785; quoted in [John Etches], A Continuation of an Authentic Statement of All the Facts Relative to Nootka Sound, London, Fores, 1790, pp. 18–29, 
 The Etches consortium scheme is discussed in Robert J. King, "'A regular and reciprocal System of Commerce'—Botany Bay, Nootka Sound, and the isles of Japan", The Great Circle (Journal of the Australian Association for Maritime History) vol.19, no.1, 1997, pp. 1–29.

External links 
  
 

Circumnavigators of the globe
English explorers
Explorers of British Columbia
English explorers of North America
English explorers of the Pacific
Royal Navy officers
18th-century explorers
1748 births
1795 deaths
Explorers of Alaska
James Cook
People from Kirkoswald, Cumbria